Carl Anton Bretschneider (27 May 1808 – 6 November 1878) was a mathematician from Gotha, Germany. Bretschneider worked in geometry, number theory, and history of geometry. He also worked on logarithmic integrals and mathematical tables. He was one of the first mathematicians to use the symbol  for Euler's constant when he published his 1837 paper. He is best known for his discovery of Bretschneider's formula for the area of a general quadrilateral on a plane,

He is the son of Karl Gottlieb Bretschneider, a theologian.

Publications 
Carl Anton Bretschneider (1837). "Theoriae logarithmi integralis lineamenta nova". Crelle Journal, vol.17, p. 257-285 (submitted 1835)

See also

 Heron's formula 
 Brahmagupta's formula

References 
Leonard Eugene Dickson, Extensions of Waring's theorem on fourth powers, Bull. Amer. Math. Soc. vol. 33 (1927) pp. 319–327
Karl August Regel, Gedächtnissrede auf Carl Anton Bretschneider in der Aula des Gymnasium Ernestinum am 15. Januar 1879. In: Programm des Herzoglichen Gymnasium Ernestinum zu Gotha als Einladung zur Theilnahme an der am 31. März zu veranstaltenden Prüfung sämmtlicher Classen. Gotha, Engelhard-Reyer Hofbuchdruckerei, 1879, S. 1–10. (Mit Schriftenverzeichnis). 
Alfred Bretschneider, Ein Gedenkblatt für seine Freunde und Schüler. Zeitschrift für Mathematik und Physik 24 – Historisch-literarische Abtheilung, 1879, S. 79–91. 
 Der Lehrsatz des Matthew Stewart, Grunert-Archiv 50, 1869, S. 11–17
 Die harmonischen Polarcurven, Grunert-Archiv 50, 1869, S. 475–499
 Die Geometrie und die Geometer vor Euklides: ein historischer Versuch, B. G. Teubner, Leipzig 1870
 Zur Berechnung des Trapezes aus seinen Seiten, Grunert-Archiv 52, 1870, S. 24–25 
 Einfache Berechnung der Winkel eines ebenen oder sphärischen Dreiecks aus den Seiten der Figur, Grunert-Archiv 52, 1870, S. 371–374

External links 
 Beiträge zur sphärischen Trigonometrie, Crelles Journal 13, 1835, S. 85–92
 Beiträge zur sphärischen Trigonometrie. (Schluß), Crelles Journal 13, 1835, S. 145–158
 Theoriae logarithmi integralis lineamenta nova, Crelles Journal 17, 1837, S. 257–285
 Untersuchung der trigonometrischen Relationen des geradlinigen Viereckes, Grunert-Archiv 2, 1842, S. 225–261
 Tafeln für die Zerlegung der Zahlen bis 4100 in Biquadrate, Crelles Journal 46, 1853, S. 1–23

19th-century German mathematicians
1808 births
1878 deaths
Geometers